OTO is a television awards show recognizing the public figures and the work of popular culture in Slovakia.

Main categories

TV Announcer
OTO Award TV Announcer

First awarded  | Last awarded 2000 | 2002

TV News and Journalism

OTO Award TV News and Journalism

First awarded  | Last awarded 2001 | 2003

TV Host – Children's Program
OTO Award TV Host – Children's Program

First awarded  | Last awarded 2001 | 2004

TV Sports – Host or Commentator

OTO Award TV Sports – Host or Commentator

First awarded  | Last awarded 2003 | 2011

TV Humorist
OTO Award TV Humorist

First awarded  | Last awarded 2006 | 2007

TV Actor – Drama | Comedy

TV Actress – Drama | Comedy

TV Host – Entertainment

TV Actor – New Artist
OTO Award TV Actor – New Artist

First awarded  | Last awarded 2012 | 2013

TV Series – Drama | Comedy

Notes
┼ Denotes also or a winner in two or more of the main categories.  † Denotes also or a winner of the Absolute OTO category.

Special awards

EuroTelevízia Award

EuroTelevízia Award

First awarded  | Last awarded 2003 | 2006

KRAS Award for TV Program Branding
KRAS Award TV Program Branding

First awarded  | Last awarded 2008

Further information
 OTO Award for TV Host – Entertainment (presented until 2013)

External links
 OTO Awards (Official website)
 OTO Awards - Winners and nominees (From 2000 onwards)
 OTO Awards - Winners and nominees (From 2000 to 2009)

List of retired OTO Awards
Slovak culture
Slovak television awards
Awards established in 2000
Former awards